Medvednik (Serbian Cyrillic: Медведник) is a mountain in western Serbia, near the town of Valjevo. Its highest peak has an elevation of 1,247 meters above sea level.

References

Mountains of Serbia